Pedro Correia or Pedro Corrêa may refer to:

Pedro Correia (footballer, born 1974), Portuguese goalkeeper
Pedro Correia (footballer, born 1987), Portuguese right-back
Pedro Correia (footballer, born 1988), Portuguese forward
Pedro Correia de Barros (1911–1968), Portuguese navy officer and colonial administrator
Pedro Correia da Cunha (1440–1497), Portuguese nobleman
Pedro Correia De Almeida, East Timorese football manager
Pedro Correia Garção (1724–1772), Portuguese lyric poet
Pedro Alves Correia or Pedro Martelo (born 1999), Portuguese football forward
 Ró-Ró (born 1990), Qatari footballer
 (born 1948), former Brazilian politician, a member of the Progressive Party